Ștefan Czinczer (26 October 1905 – 1 May 1990) was a Romanian footballer who played as a goalkeeper for teams such as AMEF Arad, UD Reșița or CA Oradea.

International career
Czinczer played at international level in six matches for Romania.

References

External links
 
 
 

1905 births
1990 deaths
Sportspeople from Arad, Romania
Romanian footballers
Romania international footballers
Association football goalkeepers
Liga I players
Liga II players
Vagonul Arad players
CSM Reșița players
CA Oradea players